The Mashpee National Wildlife Refuge is a National Wildlife Refuge in the state of Massachusetts. Established in 1995, it is administered by the Eastern Massachusetts National Wildlife Complex. The refuge includes a surface area of  managed by U.S. Fish and Wildlife Service.

Wildlife and Habitat
Salt marshes, cranberry bogs, Atlantic white cedar swamps, freshwater marshes, and a vernal pool provide habitat for wildlife such as migratory waterfowl, songbirds, shorebirds, raptors, red fox, and white-tailed deer.

The refuge staff is studying the endangered New England Cottontail (NEC) rabbit at the refuge. Biologists and volunteers are conducting surveys of rabbits and collection of scat to determine the NEC activity. Prescribed burns of forests within the refuge are used to foster habitat creation for the NEC.

Management
The refuge is managed by a unique partnership of nine federal, state and private conservation groups: and supported by the Friends of Mashpee National Wildlife Refuge
 Falmouth Rod and Gun Club     
 Massachusetts Division of Fisheries and Wildlife
 Massachusetts Executive Office of Energy and Environmental Affairs
 Orenda Wildlife Land Trust 
 Town of Falmouth Conservation Commission 
 Town of Mashpee Conservation Commission
 U.S. Fish and Wildlife Service 
 Wampanoag Indian Tribal Council (Mashpee Wampanoag Tribe)
 Waquoit Bay National Estuarine Research Reserve (WBNERR) / Massachusetts Department of Conservation and Recreation

Friends of Mashpee National Wildlife Refuge
The Friends of Mashpee National Wildlife Refuge is a nonprofit organization which supports education, research and stewardship projects within the Mashpee National Wildlife Refuge (MNWR). In 2019, the Friends group published a history book about the MNWR, available for download from the website of the U.S. Fish and Wildlife Service.

History
See: How We Got Here: The History of the Mashpee National Wildlife Refuge

References
Refuge website

Protected areas of Barnstable County, Massachusetts
National Wildlife Refuges in Massachusetts
Protected areas established in 1995
Mashpee, Massachusetts
Wetlands of Massachusetts
Landforms of Barnstable County, Massachusetts
1995 establishments in Massachusetts